Saint Latro (literally “Thief”) (c. 499 AD—570 AD) was a Frankish bishop of Laon.  He succeeded his father Saint Genebald as bishop of Laon. He is alleged to have been conceived while his father was a bishop.

References 

6th-century Frankish bishops
Bishops of Laon
490s births
570 deaths
Year of birth uncertain
6th-century Frankish saints